Panchromatic emulsion is a type of black-and-white photographic emulsion that is sensitive to all wavelengths of visible light.

Description

A panchromatic emulsion renders a realistic reproduction of a scene as it appears to the human eye, although with no colors. Almost all modern photographic film is panchromatic. Some older types of film were orthochromatic and were not sensitive to certain wavelengths of light. As naturally prepared, a silver halide photographic emulsion is much more sensitive to blue and UV light than to green and red wavelengths. The German chemist Hermann W. Vogel found out how to extend the sensitivity into the green, and later the orange, by adding sensitising dyes to the emulsion. By the addition of erythrosine the emulsion could be made orthochromatic while some cyanine derivatives confer sensitivity to the whole visible spectrum making it panchromatic. However, his technique was not extended to achieve a fully panchromatic film until the early 1900s, shortly after his death. Panchromatic stock for still photographic plates became available commercially in 1906. The switch from orthochromatic film, however, was only gradual. Panchromatic plates cost two to three times as much, and had to be developed in total darkness, unlike orthochromatic—which, being insensitive to red, could be developed under a red light in the darkroom. And the process that increased the film's sensitivity to yellow and red also made it oversensitive to blue and violet, requiring a yellow-red lens filter to correct it, which in turn reduced the total amount of light and increased the necessary exposure time.

Orthochromatic film proved troublesome for motion pictures, rendering blue skies as perpetually overcast, blond hair as washed-out, blue eyes nearly white, and red lips nearly black. To some degree this could be corrected by makeup, lens filters, and lighting, but never completely satisfactorily. But even those solutions were unusable for additive color motion picture systems like Kinemacolor and Prizma color, which photographed on black-and-white stock behind alternating color filters. In those cases, negative film stock after it arrived from the manufacturer had to be passed through a color-sensitizing solution, a time-consuming process that increased the film's cost from 3 cents per foot to 7 cents. Eastman Kodak, the supplier of motion picture film, introduced a panchromatic film stock in September 1913, available on special order for photographing color motion pictures in additive systems. Photographers began using it for black-and-white films too in 1918, primarily for outdoor scenes. The company introduced Kodak Panchromatic Cine Film as a regular stock in 1922. The first black-and-white feature film photographed entirely on panchromatic stock was The Headless Horseman (1922). But early panchromatic stock was more expensive, had a relatively short shelf-life, and was more difficult for laboratories to process because it required working in total darkness. Not until the prices were equalized by competition in 1926 did it become used more widely than orthochromatic stock. Kodak discontinued manufacturing general-purpose orthochromatic motion picture film in 1930.

Digital panchromatic imagery of the Earth's surface is also produced by some modern satellites, such as QuickBird, Cartosat and IKONOS. This imagery is extremely useful, as it is generally of a much higher (spatial) resolution than the multispectral imagery from the same satellite.

See also
Black and white
Orthochromatic
Monochromatic color
Pansharpened image

References

Photographic film types